Systolocranius is a genus of beetles in the family Carabidae, containing the following species:

 Systolocranius alternans Chaudoir, 1882 
 Systolocranius ampliolatus Peringuey, 1926 
 Systolocranius brachymorphus Chaudoir, 1882 
 Systolocranius brachypterus Basilewsky, 1949 
 Systolocranius carinatus Lecordier, 1972 
 Systolocranius centralis Lecordier, 1972 
 Systolocranius curtus Basilewsky, 1949 
 Systolocranius depressus Alluaud, 1923 
 Systolocranius discrepans Peringuey, 1908 
 Systolocranius elongatus Chaudoir, 1882 
 Systolocranius giganteus (Chaudoir, 1854) 
 Systolocranius girardi Lecordier, 1972 
 Systolocranius goryi (Gory, 1833) 
 Systolocranius ingens Alluaud, 1934 
 Systolocranius linea (Wiedemann, 1821) 
 Systolocranius lucidulus Chaudoir, 1882 
 Systolocranius luvungiensis Burgeon, 1935 
 Systolocranius mandibularis Basilewsky, 1948 
 Systolocranius parumpunctatus Lecordier, 1972 
 Systolocranius perrieri (Fairmaire, 1903)  
 Systolocranius protenius Basilewsky, 1949 
 Systolocranius ruandanus Lecordier, 1972 
 Systolocranius senegalensis Gemminger & Harold, 1868 
 Systolocranius sulcipennis Chaudoir, 1882 
 Systolocranius tibialis Lecordier, 1972 
 Systolocranius uelensis Burgeon, 1935  
 Systolocranius valens Lecordier, 1986 
 Systolocranius zavattarii G.Muller, 1941

References

Licininae